The 1936 Ottawa Rough Riders finished in 2nd place in the Interprovincial Rugby Football Union with a 3–3 record and qualified for the playoffs for the first time since their 1926 championship season. The Rough Riders defeated the Hamilton Tiger-Cats and Toronto Argonauts in the IRFU post-season, but lost the 24th Grey Cup to the Sarnia Imperials.

Regular season

Standings

Schedule

Postseason

References

Ottawa Rough Riders seasons
James S. Dixon Trophy championship seasons